Frost is a 2017 internationally co-produced drama film directed by Šarūnas Bartas. It was screened in the Directors' Fortnight section at the 2017 Cannes Film Festival. It was selected as the Lithuanian entry for the Best Foreign Language Film at the 90th Academy Awards, but it was not nominated.

Plot
The young Lithuanian Rokas (played by Mantas Janciauskas) drives with his girlfriend Inga (Lyja Maknaviciute) a humanitarian aid truck to Donbas region of Ukraine where, amid the violence and death of the War in Donbas, they meet different war reporters, one of whom is played by Vanessa Paradis.

Cast
 Mantas Jančiauskas as Rokas
 Lyja Maknavičiūtė as Inga
 Vanessa Paradis
 Weronika Rosati
 Andrzej Chyra

Production
The movie was filmed in frontline towns of Kurakhove, Marinka and Krasnohorivka. Some scenes were filmed as close as 200–300 meters to the frontline. Filming also took place in  settings in Kyiv and Dnipro in Ukraine and in Poland and Lithuania.

See also
 List of submissions to the 90th Academy Awards for Best Foreign Language Film
 List of Lithuanian submissions for the Academy Award for Best Foreign Language Film

References

External links
 

2017 films
2017 drama films
French drama films
Lithuanian-language films
Films directed by Šarūnas Bartas
Films set in Ukraine
Polish drama films
Ukrainian drama films
War in Donbas films
2010s French films